Spring Onion Culture Museum is a museum located in Sanxing Township, Yilan County, Taiwan.

History
The museum was opened in 2005.

Architecture
The museum is housed in a facility used as a rice-storage building during the Japanese rule.

Activities
The museum regularly holds food making activities.

See also
 List of museums in Taiwan

References

External links
 

2005 establishments in Taiwan
Food museums in Taiwan
Museums established in 2005
Museums in Yilan County, Taiwan